The G. M. Standifer Construction Company was an American company that built three shipyards on the Columbia River for the World War I effort, one in Oregon and two in Washington, all within spitting distance of each other. After the war it maintained its original yard in North Portland, Oregon. The North Portland yard, and one of the Vancouver, Washington yards (located where the Red Lion at the Quay is today, just west of the Interstate Bridge) produced wooden ships. The other Vancouver yard, located just west of what was then the Spokane, Portland and Seattle Railway bridge (now the BNSF bridge) produced steel-hulled ships. The Portland yard was located about a mile to the west, just downstream from the BNSF bridge. Both Vancouver yards were closed in 1921.

Standifer Steel Shipyard (1918–1919)
The Vancouver yard, referred to as the Standifier Steel Shipyard, began working steel for the assembly of merchant ships on July 13, 1918, and by October 13, 1918, was handling an average of 200 tons of steel a day with plans to begin producing a completed steel ship every two weeks.

References

Shipbuilding companies
History of Vancouver, Washington
Columbia River
Economy of Portland, Oregon
Shipbuilding in Washington (state)